Bad Cop - kriminell gut is a German television series that premiered on September 21, 2017 on RTL Television.

Plot
The twin brothers Jesko and Jan Starck (David Rott) lead both very different lives. While Jesko became a successful detective inspector, Jan has taken the career of a criminal and is thus on the other side of the law. But in a fateful moment, everything suddenly changes when Jesko is fatally injured in a police operation involving Jan. Jan then takes on the identity of his deceased brother to save his own life.

See also
List of German television series

References

External links

2017 German television series debuts
2017 German television series endings
German-language television shows
RTL (German TV channel) original programming